22881 / 82 Bhubaneswar–Pune–Bhubaneswar Express (Via. It commenced its operations on 24 February 2011, with Train Number 2582/2581.

Service
It operates as train number 22881 from Pune Junction to Bhubaneswa} and as train number 22882 in the reverse direction, serving the states of Maharashtra, Karnataka, Telangana, Andhra Pradesh & Odisha.

Coaches

The 22881 / 82 Pune Junction–Bhubaneswar Express has two AC 2-tier,  two AC 3-tier, ten sleeper class, four general unreserved & two SLR (seating with luggage rack) coaches. It doesn't carry a pantry car.

As with most train services in India, coach composition may be amended at the discretion of Indian Railways depending on demand.

Routing

Traction

References

External links
22881Pune Junction Bhubaneswar Express at India Rail Info
22882 Bhubaneswar Pune Junction Express at India Rail Info

Express trains in India
Rail transport in Maharashtra
Rail transport in Karnataka
Rail transport in Telangana
Rail transport in Andhra Pradesh
Rail transport in Odisha
Transport in Bhubaneswar
Transport in Pune
Railway services introduced in 2011